WYNL is a Contemporary Christian formatted broadcast radio station licensed to Dunbar, West Virginia, serving South-Central West Virginia.  WYNL is owned and operated by Bristol Broadcasting Company.

References

External links
 New Life 94.5 Online
 

1988 establishments in West Virginia
Contemporary Christian radio stations in the United States
Radio stations established in 1988
YNL